Arthur Bomfim Bergo (born March 7, 1994) is a Brazilian rugby union and rugby sevens player. He plays as flanker. Bergo was selected for 's sevens squad for the 2016 Summer Olympics.

References

External links 
 
 
 
 

1994 births
Living people
Male rugby sevens players
Brazilian rugby union players
Olympic rugby sevens players of Brazil
Brazil international rugby sevens players
Rugby sevens players at the 2016 Summer Olympics
Cobras Brasil XV players
Brazilian rugby sevens players
Sportspeople from São Paulo
Brazil international rugby union players
Brazilian expatriate rugby union players
Brazilian expatriate sportspeople in the United States
Expatriate rugby union players in the United States